Rio Grande is a 1938 American western film directed by Sam Nelson and starring Charles Starrett, Ann Doran and Bob Nolan.

Cast
 Charles Starrett as 	Cliff Houston
 Ann Doran as 	Jean Andrews
 Bob Nolan as 	Bob Stevens
 Dick Curtis as 	Ed Barker
 George Chesebro as 	Kruger
 Hank Bell as 	Hank
 Pat Brady as Pat
 Art Mix as Durkin
 Lee Prather as Goulding
 Sons of the Pioneers as 	Singing Ranch Hands

References

Bibliography
 Hoffmann, Henryk. Western Movie References in American Literature. McFarland,  2012.

External links
 

1938 films
1938 Western (genre) films
American Western (genre) films
Films directed by Sam Nelson
American black-and-white films
Columbia Pictures films
1930s English-language films
1930s American films